Ellington Center Historic District is an  historic district in the town of Ellington, Connecticut that was listed on the National Register of Historic Places in 1990.

The historic district encompasses most of Ellington Center, including the town green and buildings that face the green or the streets that lead to it.  It includes the Hall Memorial Library.  Architecture represented includes the Colonial Revival style and work by Nelson Chaffee. The Ellington green is largely open space with tall shade trees. A granite monument on the green identifies the site of the first meetinghouse in Ellington Center, built in 1739.

The National Register listing included 103 contributing buildings, three contributing sites, and two contributing objects.  It also included 26 non-contributing buildings, six non-contributing structures, and three non-contributing objects. The district does not include commercial property east of the green, the town hall and its annex, Center School, and several houses within its general boundaries. Center School, a public elementary school, occupies a brick building constructed in 1949 to replace a structure that was constructed in 1852 as a one-room schoolhouse and later expanded.

Hall Memorial Library, a Neo-Classical Revival building built of brick and limestone, is one of the largest buildings in the historic district. The historic district also includes two churches.

See also
National Register of Historic Places listings in Tolland County, Connecticut

References

Ellington, Connecticut
Colonial Revival architecture in Connecticut
Federal architecture in Connecticut
Greek Revival architecture in Connecticut
Historic districts in Tolland County, Connecticut
National Register of Historic Places in Tolland County, Connecticut
New England town greens
Historic districts on the National Register of Historic Places in Connecticut